Samsung Pay (stylized as SΛMSUNG Pay) is a mobile payment and digital wallet service by Samsung Electronics that lets users make payments using compatible phones and other Samsung-produced devices. The service supports contactless payments using near-field communications (NFC), but also supports magnetic strip-only payment terminals by incorporating magnetic secure transmission (MST) in devices released before 2021. In India, it also supports bill payments.

The service was launched in South Korea on August 20, 2015, and in the United States on September 28 of the same year.

Service 
Samsung Pay was developed from the intellectual property of LoopPay, a crowdfunded startup company that Samsung acquired in February 2015 for an estimated $300m, one of the largest acquisitions made by the firm. The service supports both NFC-based mobile payment systems (which are prioritized when support is detected), as well as those that only support magnetic stripes. This is accomplished via a technology known as magnetic secure transmission (MST), which emulates the swipe of a permanent magnet strip past a reader by generating the near-field magnetic waveform directly. LoopPay's developers stated that because of this design, the technology would work with "nearly 90%" of all point-of-sale units in the United States (which excludes terminals that require the card to be physically inserted into a slot in order to function).

On phones, the Samsung Pay menu is launched by swiping from the bottom of the screen. Different credit, debit and loyalty cards can be loaded into the app, and selected by swiping between them on-screen.

In South Korea, Samsung Pay can be used for online payments and to withdraw money on selected banks' ATMs.

In Mainland China, Samsung Pay supports In-app payments, QR code payments (Alipay, and WeChat Pay) and public transportation cards of Beijing, Shanghai, Guangzhou, Shenzhen, and other cities.

In Hong Kong, Samsung Pay can be linked with Octopus cards, called Smart Octopus, to make electronic payments with stored value service for payments in online or offline systems.

In India, Samsung Pay supports Unified Payments Interface (UPI) and BharatQR. It also supports bill payments via the Bharat Bill Payment System (BBPS).

In May 2020, Samsung Pay unveiled Samsung Money by SoFi, a mobile-first money management experience that makes available a cash management account and accompanying Mastercard debit card via the Samsung Pay app, in partnership with fintech company SoFi.

In June 2022, Samsung Pay was renamed to Samsung Wallet in the US, UK, France, Germany, Italy, and Spain. Along with the renaming came new features such as the ability to store digital assets and digital keys within the Wallet app. These new features also came to the Samsung Pay app in South Korea, despite it not adopting the new "Samsung Wallet" name.

Security 
Samsung Pay's security measures are based on Samsung Knox and ARM TrustZone technologies; credit card information is stored in a secure token. Payments must be authenticated using a fingerprint scan or passcode.

In August 2016, security researcher Salvador Mendoza disclosed a potential flaw with Samsung Pay, arguing that its security tokens were not sufficiently randomized and could become predictable. He also designed a handheld device that could be used to skim magnetic secure transmission tokens, and another which could spoof magnetic stripes on actual card readers using the token. Samsung responded to the report, stating that "If at any time there is a potential vulnerability, we will act promptly to investigate and resolve the issue".

Samsung Pay will not work with devices whose Knox warranty bit is tripped.

Availability

Supported countries 
Samsung Pay in South Korea, for all intents and purposes, is the Samsung Wallet app. It just is not known as the same name that it is known by in other regions.

In May 2016, it was reported that Samsung was developing a spin-off of the service known as Samsung Pay Mini. This service will be used for online payments only, and is also being targeted as a multi-platform service.

In January 2017, Samsung has confirmed that Samsung Pay Mini will not only work on its Galaxy devices but on other Android phones as well, as long as they are running Android Lollipop or above and have a screen resolution of 1280 × 720 pixels or higher.

In June 2017, Samsung launched Samsung Pay Mini and currently available on Galaxy J7 Max/On Max (in India)

Availability is limited not just on the basis of where the payment card is issued, but also on the basis of the phone's region (CSC) code. Thus a phone made for an unsupported region can never use Samsung Pay even if it physically resides in a supported region and has a local SIM card. The rather unrelated error "Connection error. Unable to connect to Samsung Pay temporarily. Try again later." is how Samsung Pay reports this problem.

In June 2020, Samsung announced a partnership between Samsung Pay, Curve and Mastercard for the launch of Samsung Pay Card in the UK and more EE countries where Curve has customers later in 2020.

From September 2021, Samsung Pay Mini was made available for Galaxy A and Galaxy M series.

Unlike other mobile wallet providers such as Google, Samsung did not fully join the sanctions on Russia after the invasion of Ukraine in February 2022, as Samsung Pay was still partly operating in the country.

Usage within public transport systems 
Due to the open nature of the Android platform, some transit cards are only available through other Android-based mobile wallets or via their own apps (e.g. SmarTrip for Google Pay or PASMO for Android). In addition, Samsung Pay does not allow for users in one region to purchase cards for another. Galaxy devices must be purchased from the region their desired transit card hails. For public transport systems where transit cards can be used, passengers can ride with Samsung Pay if such transit or payment cards can be added to Samsung Pay. Here are the scenarios where Tap & Pay mode is available.

In addition to the above scenarios, Samsung Pay can still be used with other non-Tap & Pay readers that accept contactless open loop payment cards, but they will have to be verified beforehand.

Compatible devices

Flagship smartphones

Galaxy S 
Samsung Galaxy S6 (MST technology limited to some markets, NFC technology available on all models)
Samsung Galaxy S7
Samsung Galaxy S8
Samsung Galaxy S9
Samsung Galaxy S10 (NFC only for S10 Lite)
Samsung Galaxy S20
Samsung Galaxy S21 (NFC Only for all S21 models)
Samsung Galaxy S22 (NFC Only for all S22 models)
Samsung Galaxy S23 (NFC Only for all S23 models)

Galaxy Note 
Samsung Galaxy Note5
Samsung Galaxy Note7 
Samsung Galaxy Note FE 
Samsung Galaxy Note8
Samsung Galaxy Note9
Samsung Galaxy Note10 (NFC only for Note 10 Lite)
Samsung Galaxy Note20

Galaxy Z
Samsung Galaxy Fold
Samsung Galaxy Z Flip
Samsung Galaxy Z Fold2
Samsung Galaxy Z Fold3
Samsung Galaxy Z Flip 3
Samsung Galaxy Z Fold4
Samsung Galaxy Z Flip4

Mid-range smartphones

Galaxy A 
Samsung Galaxy A5 (2016), A7 (2016), A8 (2016), A9 (2016) and A9 Pro (2016)
Samsung Galaxy A3 (2017), A5 (2017) and A7 (2017)
Samsung Galaxy A6 / A6+ (NFC only)
Samsung Galaxy A8 (2018) (NFC only for A8 Star (2018)
Samsung Galaxy A7 (2018) and A9 (2018) (NFC only)
Samsung Galaxy A40, A50, A70 and A80 (NFC only)
Samsung Galaxy A30s, A40s, A50s and A70s (NFC only)
Samsung Galaxy A90 5G (NFC only)
 Samsung Galaxy A21, A31, A51 & A51 5G, A52 5G and A71 & A71 5G (NFC only)

Galaxy M 
 Samsung Galaxy M52 5G 
 Samsung Galaxy M42 5G (also known as Samsung Galaxy A42 5G in other countries)
 Samsung Galaxy M31
 Samsung Galaxy M23 5G

Galaxy J 
Samsung Galaxy J5 & J7 (2016)
Samsung Galaxy J5 (2017)/J5 Pro
Samsung Galaxy J7 (2017)/J7 Pro
Samsung Galaxy J7 Max (2017)

Galaxy C and others 
Available to Samsung Pay users within Hong Kong, Macau and China.

Samsung Galaxy C5 and C5 Pro 
Samsung Galaxy C7 and C7 Pro 
Samsung Galaxy C9 and C9 Pro
Samsung Galaxy On5 (2016) (also known as Galaxy J5 Prime in other countries)
Samsung Galaxy On7 (2017) (also known as Galaxy J7 Prime in other countries)
Samsung Galaxy Quantum2 (NFC and MST)
Samsung W2017 (non-Galaxy smartphone)
Samsung W2018 (non-Galaxy smartphone)

Smartwatches 
Samsung Gear S2 (NFC only)
Samsung Gear S3 (NFC and MST)
Samsung Gear Sport (NFC only)
Samsung Galaxy Watch (NFC only)
Samsung Galaxy Watch Active (NFC only)
Samsung Galaxy Watch Active 2 (NFC only)
Samsung Galaxy Watch 3 (NFC only)
Samsung Galaxy Watch 4 (NFC only)
Samsung Galaxy Watch 5 (NFC only)

See also
 Samsung Wallet
Apple Pay
Google Pay
Microsoft Pay

References

2015 software
Android (operating system) software
Computer-related introductions in 2015
Mobile payments in South Korea
Samsung software